Alaska: The Last Frontier is an American reality cable television series which premiered on December 29, 2011, on the Discovery Channel. The show documents the extended Kilcher family, descendants of Swiss immigrants and Alaskan pioneers, Yule and Ruth Kilcher, at their homestead 11 miles  outside of Homer. By living without modern heating, the clan chooses to subsist by farming,  hunting and preparing for the long winters. The Kilcher family are relatives of the singer Jewel (with Atz being her father), who has appeared on the show. The tenth season premiered on October 25, 2020. In September 2022 an announcement was made that season 11 will begin airing in October 2022.

Production
Production occurs throughout the year on site. The production crew is based out of California.

Episodes

Series overview

Season 1 (2011–12)

Season 2 (2012–13)

Season 3 (2013–14)

Season 4 (2014–15)

Season 5 (2015–16)

Season 6 (2016–17)
</onlyinclude>

Season 7 (2017–18)
</onlyinclude>

Season 8 (2018–19)
</onlyinclude>

Season 9 (2019–20)

Awards and nominations
2013 CableFAX's Program & Top Ops Awards - Best Show or Series – Professions – NOMINATION
2013 Communicator Awards – Award of Distinction - WINNER
2013 Telly Award - Bronze - Main Title – WINNER
2014 Emmy Awards - Outstanding Cinematography For Reality Programming - NOMINATION
2014 Emmy Awards - Outstanding Unstructured Reality Program - NOMINATION

Bear hunting incident
In 2015, Atz Lee, his wife Jane, and a company involved in the production of the show were charged with using a helicopter as part of bear hunt while filming an episode in 2014. Using any aircraft to spot prey, or using a helicopter in any way as part of a hunt is illegal in Alaska. All three pleaded not guilty. The matter was on hold due to Atz Lee being seriously injured in a hiking accident. but eventually the charges against the Kilchers themselves were dismissed, while production company Wilma TV was fined $17,500.

References

External links

2010s American documentary television series
2011 American television series debuts
2020s American documentary television series
Discovery Channel original programming
English-language television shows
Kenai Peninsula Borough, Alaska
Television shows set in Alaska
Works about survival skills